Microstrophia modesta is a species of air-breathing land snail, terrestrial pulmonate gastropod mollusc in the family Streptaxidae.

This species is endemic to Mauritius.

References

Streptaxidae
Gastropods described in 1867
Taxonomy articles created by Polbot
Endemic fauna of Mauritius